John Doyle Lee (September 6, 1812 – March 23, 1877) was an American pioneer, murderer and prominent early member of the Latter Day Saint Movement in Utah.  Lee was later convicted as a mass murderer for his complicity in the Mountain Meadows massacre, sentenced to death and was executed in 1877.

Early Mormon leader
Lee was born on September 6, 1812, in Kaskaskia, Illinois Territory, and joined the Church of Jesus Christ of Latter Day Saints in 1838. He was a friend of Joseph Smith, founder of the church, and was the adopted son of Brigham Young under the early Latter Day Saint law of adoption doctrine. In 1839, Lee served as a missionary with his boyhood friend, Levi Stewart. Together they preached in Illinois, Ohio, Kentucky, and Tennessee. During this period Lee converted and baptized "Wild Bill" Hickman. Lee practiced plural marriage and had 19 wives (at least eleven of whom eventually left him) along with 56 children.

Lee was a member of the Danites, a fraternal vigilante organization. The Danites were first organized in Caldwell County, Missouri, during the Mormon War. Lee was also an official scribe for the Council of Fifty, a group of men who provided guidance in practical matters to the church, specifically concerning the move westward out of the established areas United States in the east to the Rocky Mountains. After Smith's death, Lee went with Brigham Young and other Latter Day Saints to what is now Utah, and worked towards establishing several new communities there. Some of those communities included Lee's Ferry and Lonely Dell Ranch, located near Page, Arizona. A successful and resourceful farmer and rancher, in 1856, Lee became a United States Indian Agent in the Iron County, Utah, area, where he was assigned to help Native Americans establish farms. In 1858, Lee served a term as a member of the Utah Territorial Legislature, and following church orders in 1872, Lee moved from Iron County and established a heavily used ferry crossing on the Colorado River, where the site is still called Lee's Ferry. The nearby ranch was named the Lonely Dell Ranch and is now listed on the National Register of Historic Places, together with the ferry site.

Mountain Meadows massacre

Massacre 
In September 1857, the Baker–Fancher party, an emigrant group from Arkansas, camped at Mountain Meadows, a staging area in southern Utah used to prepare for the long crossing of the Mojave Desert by groups travelling westward to California. They were attacked by a combined group of Native Americans and Mormon militia men dressed as Native Americans. There were multiple motives for the conflict, including a general atmosphere of rising tensions between the US Federal government and Mormon settlers (see Utah War of 1857-1858) and a rumor that the Baker–Fancher party included those who had murdered Mormons at the 1838 event known as Haun's Mill massacre.

On the third day of the siege, Lee (not dressed as a Native American) approached the Baker–Fancher encirclement under cover of a white flag and convinced the emigrants to surrender their weapons and property to the Mormons in return for safe conduct to nearby Cedar City. The emigrants accepted the offer and surrendered, however approximately 120 of the Baker–Fancher party were then killed by Mormon militia and Paiute Indians, leaving only about 17 small children as survivors. William Ashworth notes in his autobiography that after the massacre, the "leaders among the white men had bound themselves under the most binding oaths to never reveal their part in it." Lee told Brigham Young that the Indians had been solely responsible, that "no white men were mixed up in it." Lee later maintained that he had acted under orders from his militia leaders, under protest, and remained active in Mormonism and local government for several years afterwards.

Arrest and execution 

In 1874, Lee was arrested and tried for leading the massacre. The first trial ended inconclusively with a hung jury, seemingly because of the prosecution's attempt to portray Brigham Young as the true mastermind of the massacre. A second trial in 1876, in which the prosecution placed the blame squarely on Lee's shoulders, ended with his conviction and he was sentenced to death. Lee never denied his own complicity, but claimed he had not personally killed anyone. He said he had been a vocally reluctant participant and later a scapegoat meant to draw attention away from other Mormon leaders who were also involved. Lee further maintained that Brigham Young had no knowledge of the event until after it happened. However, in the Life and Confessions of John D. Lee he (or an editor) wrote, "I have always believed, since that day, that General George A. Smith was then visiting southern Utah to prepare the people for the work of exterminating Captain Fancher's train of emigrants, and I now believe that he was sent for that purpose by the direct command of Brigham Young."

On March 23, 1877, Lee was executed by firing squad at Mountain Meadows on the site of the 1857 massacre. His last words included a reference to Young: "I do not believe everything that is now being taught and practiced by Brigham Young. I do not care who hears it. It is my last word... I have been sacrificed in a cowardly, dastardly manner." On April 20, 1961, the LDS Church posthumously reinstated Lee's membership in the church.

Descendants
Lee had 19 wives and 56 children, and his descendants are now numerous. Former Solicitor General Rex E. Lee is a direct descendant of John Lee, as are his sons Senator Mike Lee of Utah and Utah Supreme Court Justice Thomas R. Lee. Another descendant, Gordon H. Smith, was a U.S. Senator from Oregon. US Representatives Mo Udall (D–AZ) and Stewart Udall (D–AZ) and their sons, Mark Udall (D–CO) and Senator Tom Udall (D–NM) are also descendants. Stewart Udall served as Secretary of the Interior under Presidents Kennedy and Johnson. See also the Lee-Hamblin family for a list of more of his noteworthy descendants.

Film portrayals
John Lee was portrayed by Jon Gries in the film September Dawn (2007).

Notes

References 
 .
 .
 .   Reissued in single-volume paperback: Huntington Library, 2004: 
 Kelly, Charles, ed. Journals of John D. Lee, 1846–47 and 1859. Salt Lake City, Priv. print. for R. B. Watt by Western printing company, 1938. Republished: Salt Lake City: University of Utah Press, 1984.
 .

External links

 John D. Lee Family Association Official Website: http://www.johndleefamily.org
 Online tree of Lee Descendants: http://www.wadhome.org/lee
 http://www.pbs.org/weta/thewest/people/i_r/lee.htm Excellent sketch of Lee's life
 
 
 
 John Doyle Lee's diary from at L. Tom Perry Special Collections, Brigham Young University

1812 births
1857 murders in the United States
1877 deaths
19th-century American politicians
19th-century Mormon missionaries
19th-century executions by the United States
19th-century executions of American people
American Mormon missionaries in the United States
American leaders of the Church of Jesus Christ of Latter-day Saints
American mass murderers
American members of the clergy convicted of crimes
American people executed for murder
Arizona pioneers
Converts to Mormonism
Danites
Deaths by firearm in Utah
Executed mass murderers
Executed people from Illinois
Executed politicians
Members of the Utah Territorial Legislature
Members of the clergy convicted of murder
Mormon memoirists
Mormon pioneers
Mountain Meadows Massacre
People convicted of murder by the United States federal government
People excommunicated by the Church of Jesus Christ of Latter-day Saints
People executed by Utah by firing squad
People executed by the United States federal government
People from Kaskaskia, Illinois
People of the Utah War
Utah politicians convicted of crimes